The Bethlehem Area Vocational-Technical School is a career and technical school located in Bethlehem, Pennsylvania in the Lehigh Valley region of eastern Pennsylvania. It was officially started in 1965 when the Bethlehem Area School District, Northampton Area School District, and Saucon Valley School District combined resources to form one vocational-technical school for its students to attend.

As of 2015, the school had a total enrollment of 1,260 students.

History
The beginning of vocational education in the Bethlehem area began way before 1965 when, in 1918, the Vocational Shop Program was started and located on East Fourth Street where the South Side Boy's Club is housed. From 1919 to 1934 a program named the Trade School was housed on Fourth Street at the Excelsior Building.

There was also a Vocational Industrial Department located in Liberty High School from 1922 to 1934. In 1934 that same school housed seventh to twelfth grades; consequently, the Industrial Department was moved to Broughal and Excelsior. Between the years of 1934-1940 academic grades from ninth to twelfth were housed at Broughal along with drafting, cabinetmaking, pattern and printing shops while carpentry, electrical, electronics and machining were housed at the Excelsior.

Bethlehem Technical High School was located at the Quinn Building for ninth to twelfth grades. It had 18 classrooms and 10 shops. The school even had its own graduation. In January 1956, vocational education was housed in the new annex building of Liberty High School, as a department. From 1956 to 1964 vocational education came under the supervision of the Liberty High School principal. Finally in 1965 it was finally called the Bethlehem Area Vocational-Technical School. It did not have its own building until 1970 when the new BAVTS school was built adjacent to Freedom High School for $3,000,000 in Bethlehem Township.

Programs
Currently BAVTS has 26 career & technical programs.  
Cosmetology
Esthetician
Protective Services
Cabinetmaking
Carpentry
Building Trades
Electrical Construction
Heating Ventilation & Air-Conditioning
Masonry
Plumbing
Commercial Art
Fashion Industries
Graphic Communications
Video & Media Arts
Web Design & Development
Baking
Culinary Arts
Health Careers
Academy of Medical Sciences
Auto Collision
Auto Technician
Welding Technologies
Academy of Engineering
Electronic Engineering & Manufacturing
Precision Machining
Athletic Heath & Fitness

Clubs
Bethlehem Area Vocational-Technical School  offers several options for club involvement. Some students are members of SkillsUSA and compete in their specific area of knowledge. Other clubs are affiliated with certain programs like Health Occupation Students of America is associated with the medical programs. Other clubs also include the National Technical Honor Society and MT6, the entrepreneurial club.

Scholarships
BAVTS began a scholarship program in 2001 by the Bridges Foundation.  The Bridges Foundation was founded by Walter J. Dealtry and BAVTS administration to raise funds for career and technical student scholarships. BAVTS Bridges Foundation scholarship funds are available for qualified BAVTS high school seniors.  Qualifying students will have their tuition waived for Continuing Education courses that offer advanced training and certification.

Continuing Education
BAVTS' adult education department is the second-largest adult vocational-technical school in Pennsylvania as measured by the number of students completing courses.  As a non-profit entity, the Continuing Education Department also shares teaching space and some essential core administrative services with Bethlehem Area Vocational-Technical School - a very cost effective relationship.

References

External links
 

Public high schools in Pennsylvania
Educational institutions established in 1965
Schools in Northampton County, Pennsylvania
Bethlehem, Pennsylvania
1965 establishments in Pennsylvania